Vahid Bridge ( Pol-e-Vahid) is a cantilevered, steel and concrete bridge over the Zayandeh River in the city of Esfahan. It was completed in 1976 and is the westernmost of the eleven bridges over the Zayandeh in Esfahan.

Transportation
 Khayyam Expressway
 Mirza Kuchak Khan Expressway

See also
 Bridges over the Zayandeh River

References 

Bridges in Isfahan
Bridges completed in 1976
Cantilever bridges
1976 establishments in Iran